Olivia Nelson-Ododa (born August 17, 2000) is an American professional basketball player for the Connecticut Sun of the Women's National Basketball Association (WNBA). She played college basketball at UConn.

High school career
Nelson-Ododa played basketball for Winder-Barrow High School in Winder, Georgia. As a sophomore, she was named Athens Banner-Herald Co-Player of the Year after averaging 17 points and 10 rebounds per game, and leading her team to the Class 6A state final. She averaged 16.2 points, 9.5 rebounds, and 3.7 blocks per game as a junior before suffering a season-ending knee injury. As a senior, she averaged 19 points, 16 rebounds, and six blocks per game, and was named Miss Georgia Basketball. She was selected to play in the McDonald's All-American Game.

Recruiting
Nelson-Ododa was rated a five-star recruit and one of the top players in the 2018 class by ESPN. On November 15, 2017, she committed to playing college basketball for UConn over offers from Duke, South Carolina, Florida State, and Georgia.

College career
As a freshman at UConn, Nelson-Ododa mostly came off the bench, averaging 4.4 points, 3.8 rebounds and 1.4 blocks per game. On December 22, 2019, she recorded a career-high 27 points, 15 rebounds and seven blocks in a 97–53 win against Oklahoma. As a sophomore, Nelson-Ododa earned Second-Team All-American Athletic Conference (AAC) honors, and averaged 10.9 points, 8.5 rebounds and an AAC-best 3.1 blocks per game. 

She became the fifth player in program history with over 100 blocks in a season. In her junior season, Nelson-Ododa averaged 12 points, 7.8 rebounds, 2.9 assists and 1.8 blocks per game. She was named Big East Co-Defensive Player of the Year and to the Second Team All-Big East.

Professional career
On April 11, 2022, Nelson-Ododa was drafted in the second round, 19th overall, by the Los Angeles Sparks in the 2022 WNBA draft.

On January 13, 2023, Nelson-Ododa was traded to the Connecticut Sun.

WNBA career statistics

Regular season

|-
| align="left" | 2022
| align="left" | Los Angeles
| 30 || 6 || 14.5 || .566 || .000 || .703 || 2.9 || 0.4 || 0.3 || 0.8 || 1.0 || 4.0
|-
| align="left" | Career
| align="left" | 1 year, 1 team
| 30 || 6 || 14.5 || .566 || .000 || .703 || 2.9 || 0.4 || 0.3 || 0.8 || 1.0 || 4.0

National team career
Nelson-Ododa won a bronze medal with the United States at the 2016 FIBA Under-17 World Championship in Spain, where she averaged a team-high 12 points, 9.4 rebounds and 1.7 blocks per game. 

At the 2018 FIBA Under-18 Americas Championship in Mexico, she averaged 9.2 points and 4.5 rebounds per game, helping her team win the gold medal. Nelson-Ododa was the youngest player representing the United States at the 2019 FIBA AmeriCup in Puerto Rico, where she won another gold medal.

Nelson-Ododa competed for the United States in 3x3 basketball at the 2019 Pan American Games in Peru, and won a gold medal.

Personal life
Nelson-Ododa's father, Sebastian Ododa, played basketball for Huntington University and the Kenyan national team. Her older brother, Alonzo, played professionally and was engaged to WNBA player Dearica Hamby. Her younger brother, Isaiah, plays college basketball for Tennessee Tech.

References

External links
UConn Huskies bio
USA Basketball bio

2000 births
Living people
American women's basketball players
Basketball players from Michigan
Basketball players from Georgia (U.S. state)
Sportspeople from Lansing, Michigan
People from Winder, Georgia
Power forwards (basketball)
UConn Huskies women's basketball players
McDonald's High School All-Americans
American people of Kenyan descent
American sportspeople of African descent
Sportspeople of Kenyan descent
United States women's national basketball team players
Pan American Games gold medalists for the United States
Basketball players at the 2019 Pan American Games
Pan American Games medalists in basketball
Medalists at the 2019 Pan American Games
Los Angeles Sparks draft picks
Los Angeles Sparks players